WWE Hall of Fame (2006) was the event which featured the introduction of the 7th class to the WWE Hall of Fame. The event was produced by World Wrestling Entertainment (WWE) on April 1, 2006 from the Rosemont Theatre in Rosemont, Illinois. The event took place the same weekend as WrestleMania 22. The event was hosted by Todd Grisham. The first two hours aired live on the WWE's website, with the final hour airing live on the USA Network. In March 2015 the ceremony was added to the WWE Network.

Inductees

Individual
 Class headliners appear in boldface

Group

Celebrity

References

WWE Hall of Fame ceremonies
2006 in professional wrestling
Professional wrestling in the Chicago metropolitan area
Events in Rosemont, Illinois
2000s in Chicago
2006 in Illinois
April 2006 events in the United States